Hellbent Games Inc. is a Canadian video game developer based in Burnaby, British Columbia. The company was founded by Christopher Mair, a founder of Rockstar Vancouver, on 12 June 2006, in Vancouver, British Columbia.

Games developed

Games published

References

External links 
 
 Official Facebook

Video game companies of Canada
Companies based in Burnaby
Video game companies established in 2006
Video game development companies
2006 establishments in British Columbia